Charles Adams Stott   (August 18, 1835 – October 31, 1912) was a Massachusetts businessman who served in the Massachusetts House of Representatives;  and as a member of the Common Council, Board of Aldermen, and the  twenty-fourth mayor of Lowell, Massachusetts.

Early life and education
Stott, the son of Charles and Sarah (MacAdams) Stott, was born on August 18, 1835 in the part of Dracut that was later set off to become Lowell.  Stott received his education in the public schools of Lowell.  Stott graduated from high school in Lowell.

Family life
Stott married Mary E. Bean, daughter of George W. Bean of Lowell,  and they had a daughter Lilla A. Stott.  Mary (Bean) Stott died in December 1860.  On December 3, 1863 Stott married Lizzie Williams, and they had four children including Edith Stott, Charles W. Stott, and Marion Stott.

Military service

From August 31, 1861, to June 3, 1862, Stott actively served as a major  in the 6th Regiment Massachusetts Volunteer Infantry.

Public service

City of Lowell
Stott represented Lowell's ward Six as a member of the Lowell, Massachusetts Common Council in 1859 and 1860, and he was a member of the Lowell Board of Aldermen from 1869
to 1870.

Mayor of Lowell

From January 1, 1876 to January 1877 Stott served as the    
twenty-fourth mayor of Lowell, Massachusetts

Commonwealth of Massachusetts

Stott was a member of the Massachusetts House of Representatives in 1866.

Party political office

From 1881 to 1883 Stott was the chairman of the Massachusetts Republican Party.

1884 U.S. Presidential election

In 1884 Stott was a presidential elector.

Death

Stott died in Lowell, Massachusetts on October 31, 1912.

References

1835 births
1912 deaths
Republican Party members of the Massachusetts House of Representatives
People of Massachusetts in the American Civil War
Lowell, Massachusetts City Council members
Mayors of Lowell, Massachusetts
People from Dracut, Massachusetts
1884 United States presidential electors
19th-century American politicians
Massachusetts Republican Party chairs